The Aquarian Weekly is a regional alternative weekly newspaper based in Little Falls, New Jersey. Founded in 1969, its focus is rock music and related events in the New Jersey/New York City/Eastern Pennsylvania region. From 1986 to 1992, it was called East Coast Rocker. After returning to its original title, the newspaper began including a pull-out section that retained the East Coast Rocker name, and which is now freely distributed throughout the region.
The paper has remained independently owned and operated throughout its existence.

History 
James Rensenbrink (1932–2013), a former employee of two New Jersey newspapers and one Louisiana newspaper, founded The Aquarian in 1969. The Aquarian initially concentrated on radical politics and uncompromising ecological writings, raging against media monopolies as well as antiquated marijuana laws.

In the beginning, The Aquarian promoted hippie culture and healthy lifestyles, dropping issues sporadically from 1969 to 1974 at the cost of 15 cents per issue in 1969, 10 cents by 1971, then becoming free by 1972. In 1973, The Aquarian hit stride, mixing its sociopolitical views and drug culture coverage with new popular music features, as well as covering underground nightspots like CBGB

The October '73 issue offered a picture of Mick Jagger on its cover, an in-depth interview with the Eagles, and a review of the Allman Brothers Band at Trenton's State Fairgrounds. The February 20, 1974, issue had a pink-hued front cover, while the next issue on March 14, 1974, featured an out-of-shape man in blue and red Superman cape plus the first Classified section, bringing a stabilized 25-cent price to customers. By 1977, The Aquarian became a full-time weekly at a cost of 50 cents.

By January 5, 1983, East Coast Rocker provided full-time music coverage inside The Aquarian while the concurrent New York Arts Weekly concentrated on non-music items and poetry for its strictly New York City audience. On July 18, 1984, the first "Records in Review" section appeared, rating new recordings on a scale of 1 to 10. For issue 614, dated February 12, 1986, The Aquarian changed to a smaller, more accessible 8x12 size. By issue 623 (April 16, 1986), The Aquarian proudly boasted that it was currently "The Only Weekly Music Newspaper in the U.S."

An important historical date was July 16, 1986, when issue 637 temporarily marked the end of The Aquarian in favor of the more conveniently named East Coast Rocker, offering its first issue on July 23, 1986.

East Coast Rocker'''s May 16, 1990, edition celebrated its 200th issue. A price of $1.50 was established for East Coast Rocker on March 21, 1990, lasting for over 14 years.

The publication changed back to its Aquarian Weekly handle on October 21, 1992, resuming at issue 638 following 326 weekly editions as East Coast Rocker.

By 1996, The Aquarian had become an 11-member co-operative based on employee ownership, consisting of Rensenbrink and several staffers. In 1998, ad director Diane Casazza, ad representative Chris Farinas and production director Mark Sceurman took over publishing.

 Notable former staff 
Jeff Tamarkin – "On the Island"
Vin Scelsa – Fiction
Jim Testa – Contributing editor, film and theater
Jay Lustig – Co-managing editor
Clifford Meth – Contributing writer
Elaine Halbersberg – Contributing writer
JJ Koczan – Managing editor (currently editor at The Obelisk'')
Hank Kalet - Political columnist, Guerrilla for Sale

References

External links 
 

Alternative weekly newspapers published in the United States
Newspapers published in New Jersey
Publications established in 1969